Craigmore may refer to one of the following places:

 Craigmore (hill), in the Trossachs, Scotland
 Craigmore, part of Rothesay, Isle of Bute, Scotland 
 Craigmore, Nova Scotia, Canada
 Craigmore, South Australia
Craigmore High School
Craigmore Christian School
 Craigmore, Zimbabwe
 Craigmore, County Antrim, a townland of County Antrim, Northern Ireland
 Craigmore, Aghadowey, a townland in County Londonderry, Northern Ireland
 Craigmore, Maghera civil parish, a townland in County Londonderry, Northern Ireland